The Rt. Rev. Robert Draper   was an Anglican bishop in Ireland.

Draper was Rector of Trim, County Meath. He was Bishop of Kilmore and Ardagh from 1604 until 1612.

References

17th-century Anglican bishops in Ireland
Bishops of Kilmore and Ardagh